Sin Don is a 2005-2006 South Korean television series based on the novel The Phantom Queen by Park Jong-hwa that starring Son Chang-min, Jeong Bo-seok, Seo Ji-hye, Oh Man-seok and Kang Moon-young. It aired on MBC from September 24, 2005 until May 7, 2006 every Weekends (Saturdays and Sundays) at 21:40 - 22:40.

This series's first title was actually same like the Novel's title but later was change like now after Son Chang-min took the main role as Sin Don. Son also make his first appearance in Sageuk series since Tale of Chunhyang in 1988.

Cast

Main
Son Chang-min as Sin Don
Kim Kyung-hwan as young Sin Don
Jeong Bo-seok as Grand Prince Gangneung, later King Gongmin
Seo Ji-hye as
Princess Supreme of the No State, King Gongmin's first wife and a Yuan Princess.
Banya, King Gongmin's concubine and Sin Don's maid.
Bang Joon-seo as young Banya
Jeon Ha-eun as child Banya
Oh Man-seok as Won Hyung
Kang Moon-young as Cho Sun

Extended cast
Hwang Geum-hee as 	Lady Yoon Hee-bi
Lee Bong-kyoo as Ra Ma-seung
Kim Jong-ho as a fisherman
Lee Jin-hwa as Woo Dae-un
Lee Chang-hwan as Shin Won-kyung
Yang Eun-yong as a maid-servant in Okcheon Temple
Jeon Su-ji as Ban Ya's birth mother
Guk Jung-hwan as Ki-Chul's head servant
Han Young-soo as Cho-Sun's head servant
Choi Eun-sook as Lee Je-hyun's wife

OST

Airing cancel reasons
October 15, 2005: canceled due to MBC University Organization.
December 31, 2005: canceled due to the airing of MBC Gayo Daejejeon.
January 1, 2006: canceled due to the New Year's Special Event.
January 28–29, 2006: canceled due to the formation of Lunar New Year special film Another Public Enemy and Innocent Steps.

Notes

References

MBC TV television dramas
South Korean historical television series
2005 South Korean television series debuts
2006 South Korean television series endings